D124 is a state road on Dugi Otok Island in Croatia connecting the D109 state road to Brbinj ferry port, from where Jadrolinija ferries fly to the mainland, docking in Zadar and the D407 state road.

The road, as well as all other state roads in Croatia, is managed and maintained by Hrvatske ceste, a state-owned company.

Traffic volume 

Traffic volume is not counted on the D124 road directly, however Hrvatske ceste, operator of the road reports number of vehicles using Zadar – Brbinj ferry line, connecting the D124 road to the D407 state road. Substantial variations between annual (AADT) and summer (ASDT) traffic volumes are attributed to the fact that the road connects a number of island resorts to the mainland.

Road junctions and populated areas

Sources

State roads in Croatia
Transport in Zadar County
Dugi Otok